Sedaví is a municipality in the province of Valencia in the Valencian Community, Spain. It belongs to the comarca of Horta Sud.

References

Municipalities in the Province of Valencia
Horta Sud